Facit railway station served Facit near Whitworth, Rossendale, Lancashire, England, from 1870 until closure to passengers in 1947 and freight in 1963.

References

Lost Railways of Lancashire by Gordon Suggitt

Disused railway stations in the Borough of Rossendale
Former Lancashire and Yorkshire Railway stations
Railway stations in Great Britain opened in 1870
Railway stations in Great Britain closed in 1947